Gibbidessus chipi is a species of beetle in the family Dytiscidae, the only species in the genus Gibbidessus.

References

Dytiscidae